Bimbo Balogun, sometimes referred to as Abimbola Balogun, is a Nigerian award-winning jeweler and businesswoman. She is the CEO of Bimbeads Concept.

Background
Bimbo Balogun hails from Idoani in Ondo State, Nigeria. She is the third child from a family of seven. Bimbo had her secondary education at the Federal Government College, Idoani in Ondo State. After this she proceeded to the Petroleum Training Institute, Efurrun, Warri, Delta State were she studied Petroleum Marketing Technology. After graduating and completing the mandatory national youth service in Nigeria, She then began working at bead making due to lack of jobs. Bimbo has since then adopted the use of sea shells, star fish, oyster shells amongst other objects in the making of jewelry. In addition to bead making, Bimbo also hosts a weekly Nigerian television show which focus on teaching youths and women o how to make jewelry.

Awards and recognition
At an early stage of her jewelry making, Bimbo won the Goldman Sachs scholarship which allowed her to enroll at the Pan Atlantic University, Lagos State. Also, she won The Accessory Company of 2013 award by Wed Expo, and the Design School of The Year by Azaria 360.

References

External links
 Bimbeads Concept

Living people
Nigerian television personalities
Nigerian television talk show hosts
21st-century Nigerian businesswomen
21st-century Nigerian businesspeople
Nigerian women company founders
Television personalities from Lagos
Women television personalities
Year of birth missing (living people)
Nigerian jewellers
Pan-Atlantic University alumni
Women jewellers